Luca Rambaldi (born 9 December 1994) is an Italian rower, gold medallist at the 2018 World Rowing Championships and at the European Rowing Championships in the men's quadruple sculls. He competed at the 2020 Summer Olympics, in Quadruple sculls.

Achievements

References

External links
 

1994 births
Living people
Italian male rowers
World Rowing Championships medalists for Italy
European Rowing Championships medalists
Sportspeople from Ferrara
Mediterranean Games gold medalists for Italy
Mediterranean Games medalists in rowing
Competitors at the 2018 Mediterranean Games
Rowers of Fiamme Gialle
Rowers at the 2020 Summer Olympics
Olympic rowers of Italy